WXGA may refer to:

 Wide Extended Graphics Array, a computer graphics display resolution
 WXGA-TV, a television station in the U.S. state of Georgia